Vittoria Piisimi (fl. 1595), was an Italian actress, singer, dancer, theatre director and musician.  She was one of the most famous Italian actors of the period and known as the Divine Vittoria Piisimi. She and Isabella Andreini were the two most famed actresses of the era, and described as great rivals.

Life
Piisimi was the primadonna of the famous commedia dell’arte Gelosi Company of Flaminio Scala. The company, first mentioned in 1568, was the first Commedia to tour outside Italy when it performed in Paris in 1571, and was described as the foremost commedia dell’arte troupe. Piisimi is first mentioned in 1573, and confirmed as a member of the Gelosi troupe in 1574. she would in fact have been active earlier, as it was known that her lover, actor Adriano Valerini from Verona, left her for Vincenza Armani, who died in 1569, four years before 1573.

Piisimi received great praise and replaced Armani as the primadonna of the Italian theatre. Piisimi combined her acting with singing, dancing and by writing music and was reportedly admired also in these fields. She was called comica gelosa and mainly played the parts of heroine and subretto. On 24 July 1574, she performed for Henry III of France in the role of Pallas Athena in Venice, where she received great praise. At this point, she was the most famous actress in Italy and was internationally known. Her performance was especially requested by the French monarch upon his visit to Venice in 1574. In 1579-1581, she was the leader of her own theatre company. She then returned to the Gelosi.

In 1589, the Gelosi troupe performed in Florence at the wedding of Grand Duke Ferdinand de Medici and Christina of Lorraine. At this event, the "rival prima donnas" Vittoria Piisimi performed as the gypsy in Zingara and Isabella Andreini as the madwoman in La Pazzia d’Isabella. Their performances were considered the great highlight of the event and became a famous event of their rivalry.

In 1592, Piisimi left the Gelosi theatre. She was for a time the director of the Gli Uniti company. She returned to the Gelosi company in 1595.

The death date of Piisimi is unknown. She is last mentioned in 1595.

References 

 Commedia dell'Arte Women Timeline
 Commedia dell'Arte Troupes Timeline
 
 M. A. Katritzky: The Art of Commedia: A Study in the Commedia Dell'Arte 1560-1620 with special reference to the visual records (2006)
 

16th-century births
Year of death unknown
Italian female dancers
16th-century Italian musicians
Commedia dell'arte
16th-century Italian actresses
Italian stage actresses
Italian opera singers
Italian women singers
16th-century Italian singers
16th-century dancers
16th-century theatre managers
Women theatre managers and producers
16th-century Italian businesswomen
Renaissance women